"Orangefield" is a song written by Northern Irish singer-songwriter Van Morrison and released on his 1989 album Avalon Sunset.  The song takes place on "a golden autumn day" and is named for the school for boys (now Orangefield High School) that Morrison attended during his youth in Belfast, Northern Ireland.

The song was also a minor hit in the Netherlands, charting at number 70.

Recording and composition
"Orangefield" was recorded in summer 1988 at Eden Studios in London with Mick Glossop as engineer.

Brian Hinton gave his interpretation of the song and lyrics as:  "In 'Orangefield' we're back in the territory of Astral Weeks  in both historical and psychic terms... she was the apple of his eye—both fruitful (like the name of his school) and Eve tempting him to sin—and her beauty becomes like the sun, or God."

Another biographer, Clinton Heylin defined the song: "Certainly in 'Orangefield', another installment in Morrison's perennial paean to a 'lost love in Belfast', the words say very little but the mood is persuasive.  Back in touch with the spirit of yesteryear, he walks through the old park remembering 'a golden autumn day'  [when] you came my way in Orangefield."

Other releases
"Orangefield" was one of the songs performed on the 1990 video Van Morrison The Concert.

Personnel
Van Morrisonvocals, guitar
Arty McGlynnguitar
Neil Drinkwaterpiano
Clive Culbertsonbass guitar
Roy Jones, Dave Earlydrums, percussion
Katie Kissoon, Carol Kenyonbacking vocals

Renditions
"Orangefield" was performed by Duke Special at his concert in St George's Market on 2 December 2008.

References

Sources
Heylin, Clinton (2003). Can You Feel the Silence? Van Morrison: A New Biography, Chicago Review Press 
Hinton, Brian (1997). Celtic Crossroads: The Art of Van Morrison,  Sanctuary, 

Van Morrison songs
1989 singles
Songs written by Van Morrison
1989 songs
Mercury Records singles
Song recordings produced by Van Morrison